The current Box Elder Stake Tabernacle, also known as the Brigham City Tabernacle, is a neo-Gothic tabernacle of the Church of Jesus Christ of Latter-day Saints rebuilt in Brigham City, Box Elder County, Utah by Mormon pioneers in 1897 after being gutted by fire a year earlier. The tabernacle continues to function as a meetinghouse for congregants of the Box Elder Stake and seats approximately 1600. It also host concerts and other special events and is open for tours during the summer. Given its unique architecture and importance to the community, the tabernacle was listed on National Register of Historic Places on May 14, 1971. A recently built temple stands across from the tabernacle.

Original structure
The site for the tabernacle was chosen by LDS Church President Brigham Young, who after visiting a different site selected by local church officers, went atop "Sagebrush hill" the highest point along main street and reportedly stated "this is the spot for your tabernacle." On May 8, 1865, Young assisted in laying the cornerstone for the tabernacle.  Around 1880 meetings began to be held in a rudimentary structure without the tower, gallery, or buttresses. In 1889, it was voted to "complete" the building by adding a tower, a gallery, a rear vestibule, capped brick buttresses, and other improvements. The tabernacle was completed and dedicated on October 28, 1890 by Young's successor, Wilford Woodruff.

Fire and rebuilding
The tabernacle was gutted by fire in 1896, just 6 years after being completed in 1890. On Sunday February 9, 1896, as church members began to assemble a fire broke out in the furnace room, the building ignited and was reduced to blackened stone walls. Within a year the tabernacle was rebuilt with elegant woodwork, a distinctive gothic/revival tower and sixteen graceful pinnacles, and rededicated by George Q. Cannon on March 21, 1897.

Renovations
In 1951 an organ from the Reuter Organ Company was installed. On April 12, 1987, LDS apostle Boyd K. Packer, native of Brigham City, rededicated the tabernacle after extensive renovations.

In 2012 the grounds were re-landscaped along with the construction of the Brigham City Utah Temple, and a new media center was put in as a kind of visitors center.

See also
 Brigham City Utah Temple

References

External links

19th-century Latter Day Saint church buildings
Buildings and structures in Brigham City, Utah
Gothic Revival architecture in Utah
Churches on the National Register of Historic Places in Utah
Churches completed in 1897
Tabernacles (LDS Church) in Utah
National Register of Historic Places in Box Elder County, Utah